Indiana Township may refer to the following townships in the United States:

 Indiana Township, Graham County, Kansas
 Indiana Township, Allegheny County, Pennsylvania